The 1992–93 season was the 113th season of competitive football by Rangers.

Overview
Rangers played a total of 64 competitive matches during the 1992–93 season. They completed the club's fifth domestic treble. The team finished first in the Scottish Premier Division and collected the fifth of their nine league titles in a row, after winning 33 of their 44 league games.

Influential England international midfielder Trevor Steven returned to Ibrox from Marseille for a fee of £2.4m.

In domestic competition, Aberdeen were Rangers closest challengers. Finishing runners-up in the league and finalists in both cup competitions. The league title was secured with a 1–0 win away to Airdrieonians in North Lanarkshire.

In the cup competitions, they defeated Aberdeen 2–1 in the Scottish Cup final, with goals from Neil Murray and Mark Hateley. The League Cup was also won after extra time, with a 2–1 win over the Dons.

Rangers became the first British club to appear in the UEFA Champions League after defeating Danish side Lyngby BK and Leeds United in a match dubbed the Battle of Britain. Although unbeaten the club finished second in Group A one-point behind French champions Marseille, who defeated A.C. Milan in the final. Marseille were later stripped of their Ligue 1 title due to a match fixing scandal.

Transfers

In

Out

Results
All results are written with Rangers' score first.

Scottish Premier Division

UEFA Champions League

League Cup

Scottish Cup

Appearances

League table

See also
 1992–93 in Scottish football
Nine in a row

References

External links
"When Rangers nearly conquered Europe..." – Sky Sports

Rangers F.C. seasons
Rangers
Scottish football championship-winning seasons